The 1938 New South Wales state election was held on 26 March 1938. This election was for all of the 90 seats in the 32nd New South Wales Legislative Assembly and was conducted in single member constituencies with compulsory preferential voting.

The result of the election was:
United Australia Party 37 seats
Country Party 22 seats
Australian Labor Party 28 seats
Industrial Labor Party 2 seats
Independent 1 seat.

The UAP/Country Party coalition of Bertram Stevens and Michael Bruxner had a majority of 28 (down 2). Stevens continued as Premier until 5 August 1939 when he resigned after being censured by the Legislative Assembly, with 10 United Australia members crossing the floor. He was replaced as Premier by Alexander Mair.

Lang Labor reconciled with Labor in February 1936, however Labor's primary vote continued to decline. Labor's continued poor showing in this election was seen as evidence of Jack Lang's inability to appeal to the middle ground of the electorate. As a result, moves to dispose Lang intensified. The Industrial Labor Party led by Lang rival Bob Heffron was re-absorbed into the Labor on 26 August 1939 and Lang was replaced as party leader by William McKell on 5 September 1939.

During this parliament Labor and Industrial Labor each won 2 by-elections from the United Australia Party. This reduced the Government's majority to 20 when the parliament was dissolved.

Key dates

Results

{{Australian elections/Title row
| table style = float:right;clear:right;margin-left:1em;
| title        = New South Wales state election, 26 March 1938
| house        = Legislative Assembly
| series       = New South Wales state election
| back         = 1935
| forward      = 1941
| enrolled     = 1,607,833
| total_votes  = 1,183,257
| turnout %    = 95.79
| turnout chg  = –0.27
| informal     = 32,237
| informal %   = 2.65
| informal chg = –0.39
}}

|}

Retiring members

Changing seats 

The member for Woollahra, Sir Daniel Levy, died in 1937. The resulting by-election was won by Harold Mason however he did not contest the election and the seat was regained by Vernon Treatt.

See also
 Members of the New South Wales Legislative Assembly, 1938–1941
 Candidates of the 1938 New South Wales state election

Notes

References

Nairn, Bede (1995) Jack Lang the 'Big Fella':Jack Lang and the Australian Labor Party 1891-1949 Melbourne University Press Melbourne  

Elections in New South Wales
New South Wales
1930s in New South Wales
New South Wales state election